The Ascodichaenaceae are a family of fungi in the order Rhytismatales.

References

Leotiomycetes
Ascomycota families
Taxa named by David Leslie Hawksworth